Phyllonorycter fasciformis is a moth of the family Gracillariidae. It is known from Bihar, India.

The larvae feed on Polygonum glabrum. They probably mine the leaves of their host plant.

References

fasciformis
Moths of Asia
Moths described in 1930